Paul Vervaeck (born 7 March 1956) is a Belgian basketball coach. He currently serves as a head coach for Yoast United of the BNXT League.

Coaching career 
On 16 June 2016 Vervaeck was announced as head coach of ZZ Leiden. The team finished as runner-up in both the Dutch Basketball League (DBL) and the NBB Cup in the 2017–18 season. After his second season, he left the club for Kangoeroes Mechelen.

References

1956 births
Living people
Antwerp Giants coaches
Belgian basketball coaches
Kangoeroes Basket Mechelen coaches
Zorg en Zekerheid Leiden coaches
Yoast United coaches